Major-General  Martin John Rutledge  (born 1954) is a former British Army officer who commanded 5th Division.

Military career
Born in Birmingham, Rutledge was educated at Wadham College, Oxford, and the Royal Military Academy Sandhurst, Rutledge was commissioned into the 9th/12th Royal Lancers in 1973. He became Commanding Officer of his regiment in 1994. He was appointed Director, Royal Armoured Corps in 2002, Chief of Staff to the Adjutant General's Corps in 2005 and Kosovo Protection Corps Co-ordinator in 2007 before becoming General Officer Commanding 5th Division in 2008. He retired in 2012 and became Chief Executive of ABF - The Soldiers' Charity.

References

1954 births
Living people
British Army generals
Companions of the Order of the Bath
Officers of the Order of the British Empire
9th/12th Royal Lancers officers
Alumni of Wadham College, Oxford
Graduates of the Royal Military Academy Sandhurst
Military personnel from Birmingham, West Midlands